Puffkins is a series of spherical stuffed animals distributed by Lisle, Illinois-based Swibco. It was introduced in 1997 as a competitor to Beanie Babies. Puffkins are sold with a tag containing a birthdate and poem, and like Beanie Babies, the toys have new designs introduced and other designs retired. Although Puffkins were retired in 2002, Swibco re-introduced the line as Puffkins 2 in 2007 with mostly the same design.

History
Swibco, a toy company based in Lisle, Illinois, introduced the Puffkins line on May 24, 1997. Thirteen different Puffkins designs were released on that day. Like Beanie Babies, every Puffkin wore a heart-shaped swing tag bearing a name, poem and birth date, and various designs were retired and introduced periodically. Certain designs of the toys were also considered more valuable, usually because of a low production number or a rarely seen color variation. The most valuable was a white tiger named Snowball; the first Puffkin to be retired, its original design sold for as high as $150. Swibco retired the Puffkins line in 2002, but restarted the toy line in 2007 under the name Puffkins 2, which feature largely the same design but are made of a softer material.

References

Products introduced in 1997
1990s toys
Stuffed toys
2000s toys